Camp Arrowhead can refer to:

Camp Arrowhead (Alabama), a campground located on the Coosa River
Camp Arrowhead (Delaware), a campground in Lewes, Delaware
Camp Arrowhead (Texas), a campground for girls in Hunt, Texas
Camp Arrowhead (Washington), a Girl Scout campground in Stevenson, Washington
Camp Arrowhead (Tuxedo, North Carolina), listed on the NRHP in North Carolina
Camp Arrowhead (Missouri), a Boy and Cub Scout camp in Marshfield, Missouri operated by the Ozark Trails Council.
Camp Arrowhead (Tennessee)
YMCA Camp Arrowhead, a day camp located in Marlboro, New Jersey